The Unusuals is an American crime television series created by Noah Hawley for ABC. It follows the detectives in the New York City Police Department's fictional 2nd Precinct, many of whom have their secret eccentricities. The series ran for one season from April 8, 2009, to June 17, 2009.

Premise
Casey Shraeger transfers from Vice to the New York City Police Department's 2nd Precinct to work at Sergeant Harvey Brown's station. Her new partner is Jason Walsh, whose previous partner was killed the same night Casey was assigned to him. Casey was chosen because Brown believes her to be incorruptible, since she comes from a wealthy family and chose to work for the police from a sense of doing good, instead of money. Casey recruits her new partner in search of Walsh's ex-partner's killer. He was known to be corrupt, but he finds the others at the 2nd Precinct, particularly Henry Cole who once lived by another name and robbed an armored car. Cole's partner, Allison Beaumont, is identified as Walsh's girlfriend. Besides Shraeger, Walsh, Beaumont and Cole, the station has three detectives: Leo Banks, who wears a bulletproof vest everywhere he goes, because he is afraid he will die, as his father, grandfather and uncle did; Banks' partner Eric Delahoy, who has a brain tumor with hallucination, but refuses to notify anyone, for fear that treatment could kill or cripple him; and Eddie Alvarez, who sees himself as a "lone wolf" and talks about himself in the third person. The series ending left the question of Delahoy's fate unresolved.

Cast

Main
 Amber Tamblyn as Detective Casey Shraeger, scion of a wealthy New York family hiding her background.
 Jeremy Renner as Detective Jason Walsh, an experienced and respected detective with a painful past partnered with Shraeger after his partner died.
 Harold Perrineau as Detective Leo Banks, who has an extreme paranoia of death.
 Joshua Close as Detective Henry Cole, a young detective with dark history.
 Monique Gabriela Curnen as Detective Allison Beaumont, one of the few female detectives at 2nd Precinct.
 Kai Lennox as Detective Eddie Alvarez, the oddball of 2nd Precinct who speaks of himself in the third person and lacks social skills.
 Terry Kinney as Sergeant Harvey Brown, the commander of the 2nd Precinct.
 Adam Goldberg as Detective Eric Delahoy, Banks' witty partner.

Recurring
 Chris Sarandon as Walter Shraeger, Casey's wealthy father.
 Heather Burns as Bridget Demopolis, a dispatch operator in the 2nd Precinct whom Banks harbors romantic feelings for.
 Ryan O'Nan as Frank Lutz, Cole's former criminal accomplice.
 Kat Foster as Nicole Brandt, an attorney married to Alvarez and former high school classmate of Shraeger.
 Ian Kahn as Davis Nixon, Shraeger's financial manager who makes a relationship with her.
 Susan Park as Dr. Monica Crumb, the 2nd Precinct's medical examiner.
 Matthew Maher as Marvin Bechamel, a mentally-disabled criminal whom Walsh meet.
 Robyn Rikoon as Amy Burch, Cole's fiancée.
 Robert Funaro as Officer Leach, a 2nd Precinct police officer.
 Cristin Milioti as sketch artist, an unnamed member of the 2nd Precinct responsible for constructing facial composite.
 Marcella Lowery as Officer Shelia Trunk, a 2nd Precinct police officer.

Episodes

Reception 
The series holds a 72% rating on Rotten Tomatoes.

Home media
The series was released on DVD for Amazon on April 6, 2010. It can be found on Netflix (via DVD only, not streaming), Hulu, Amazon.com, and free of charge on Crackle.

References

External links

2000s American comedy-drama television series
2000s American crime drama television series
2000s American police comedy television series
2009 American television series debuts
2009 American television series endings
American Broadcasting Company original programming
English-language television shows
Television series by Sony Pictures Television
Television shows set in New York City
Fictional portrayals of the New York City Police Department
Television series created by Noah Hawley